John Roger Davis Jr. (born July 25, 1927) is a retired American diplomat. From 1988 to 1990, he served as the United States Ambassador to Poland, where he helped guide Solidarity, and Poland, in its quest for free elections. Later, from 1992 to 1994, he served as the United States Ambassador to Romania.

Former Director of National Intelligence Dan Coats named Davis as the fourth person – after Lech Walesa, Mikhail Gorbachev and Pope John Paul II – who had “the most critical role in bringing about the collapse of communism in Eastern Europe”.

Early life and education
John Roger Davis Jr. was born on July 25, 1927, in Eau Claire, Wisconsin. His father's family owned Dells Paper & Pulp company, the biggest company in town. His mother, Petronilla Mary Wilcox, was an accomplished pianist and harpist who attended the Boston Conservatory of Music.  His aunt, Gwendolyn Davis, was married to John G. Blystone the Hollywood movie director known for the Charlie Chan series and the Tom Mix westerns.    

In 1938, he moved with his family to California so that his father, John R. Davis, and uncle, David R. Davis, could go into business together.    

David R. Davis, was an aviation pioneer, who helped found the company that later became the Douglas Aircraft corporation.  In 1920, David R. Davis formed a company with Donald Douglas to build airplanes, known as the Davis-Douglas company, advancing Douglas $40,000 to build the Cloudster, which was the first aircraft to take off with a payload and fuel supply heavier than its own weight.   A few years later, David R. Davis sold out to Douglas for a $2500 promissory note.  The firm became Douglas Aircraft corporation, now McDonnell-Douglas Inc.   David R. Davis went on to invent the “Davis Wing” – a better airfoil that provided far greater lift per square foot of wing area than any other design.  It was patented in the 1930’s and was a major component of the B-24 Liberator bombers in World War 2.  Despite its initial success, the airfoil design was ultimately surpassed by competitors.  

While living in California, John R. Davis, Jr. attended The Webb Schools starting in 1943, and graduated in 1945.  He then enlisted in the United States Navy, where he served during World War II.  He was graduated from the University of California, Los Angeles, where he received his bachelor of arts in political science in 1953. He later received a master's degree from Harvard University in 1965.

Foreign Service
Davis was appointed a United States Foreign Service officer in 1955.

He got married just before arriving at his first posting in Jakarta. Over the years, he would be posted in Poland multiple times, as well as Milan, Rome, and Sydney. In 1982, he visited China with John H. Holdridge.

Poland
Davis was first posted to Poland from 1960 to 1963, before returning again from 1973 to 1976. as Deputy Chief of Mission.  During these trips, his children became fluent in Polish, and Davis became well-known.

Chargé d'affaires
John Roger Davis Jr was the Director of Eastern European Affairs at the US State Department when Polish General Wojciech Jaruzelski declared martial law on Dec 13, 1981.  Solidarity was suspended and then officially banned in October 1982 and many people Davis knew were arrested.  Davis moved into a cot in his office at the State Department when martial law was imposed.   In 1982, President Ronald Reagan nominated a new Ambassador to Poland, but the Polish government would not accept the nomination.  

With the departure of Ambassador Francis J. Meehan during the imposition of martial law in Poland, and the subsequent Polish refusal to accept his announced successor, the United States lacked a permanent representative in Poland.   Relations between Poland and the United States were at an all-time low when Davis was sent by President Reagan as the United States Charge D’Affaires, beginning in September 1983.  At the time of his assignment, he anticipated the assignment would last 6 months.  It ended up lasting 7 years.   Thus, Davis was sent by President Reagan as the United States chargé d'affaires, beginning in September.

In October, 1983, Lech Walesa won the Nobel peace prize.  Walesa, fearful that if he left Poland the authorities would not let him return, sent his wife Danuta to accept the prize on his behalf. Davis went to Gdansk to deliver President Reagan’s congratulations to Mr. Walesa, joining Walesa and a dozen of his supporters in the study of the rectory of St Brigid’s church. They listened to the radio broadcast from Oslo.  That evening, there was a mass at St Brigid’s church and John sat next to Walesa in the sanctuary.  The Polish press reported the next day that “Davis, a fluent Polish speaker, sang the Polish national anthem along with the rest of the congregation earlier in the service and he and his wife received communion during the mass”. 

As charge d’Affaires from 1983 to 1988, and then Ambassador from 1988 to 1990, Davis shepherded the solidarity movement toward democracy: regularly hosting leaders of Solidarity and other political prisoners at his residence.  Throughout his tenure in Warsaw, Davis had frequent informal gatherings – evenings ostensibly spent socializing, watching recent American movies, and eating large batches of beef stroganoff or lasagna in the Ambassador’s residence – allowing members of Solidarity to meet with each other and to talk to the Ambassador.  By 1989, Davis had assumed the role of a close confidant and advisor to Solidarity’s leadership, allowing the dissidents to act as they saw fit but nonetheless offering his support and input on the most important issues when it was requested. 

Davis and his wife held film and buffet dinners 2-3 times a month, inviting old friends who would bring people they didn’t know but whom they thought they should meet.  Davis liked to confuse the militia by having people arrive by streetcar rather than in cars whose license plates could be noted down by the militia who had a box across the street from the Ambassador’s residence.

During this time, the US government was very reluctant to appear conciliatory toward Poland and was watching in particular the fate of “the eleven” – top Solidarity leaders who had been in prison for 2 years and who were still awaiting trial.   

On October 20, 1984, Father Jerzy Popieluszko, a Solidarity supporter who was known for his outspoken sermons, was reported missing.  Popieluszko’s driver said he and the priest had been abducted by 3 men and that he had managed to escape but didn’t know what happened to the priest, who he had seen being put into the trunk of the car.    On Oct 30, 1984, Popieluszko’s body was found, bound with rope and thrown into a reservoir near Torun.  He had been strangled.  A secret policeman confessed to being part of the plot.  The funeral was held on Nov 3, 1984.  Senator Kennedy attempted to attend but the Polish government would not give him a visa. 
 

Davis attended the funeral and sat in the first row of mourners,  He was the only foreign diplomat at the funeral. The crowd numbered close to a half million people. 

During these years Davis worked behind the scenes to help get Solidarity members out of jail. 

In 1986, after the Chernobyl nuclear power plant disaster, Davis decided not to evacuate the US Embassy in Warsaw after talking to the EPA and having them send a team to Warsaw with Geiger counters and advice on how to deal with the events.  He cooperated closely with Professor Zbigniew Jaworski of the Central Lab for Radiological Protection during this period, and arranged an international deal for shipment by air of large quantities of powdered milk for Polish children to replenish strategic reserves which were rapidly being depleted.  Diplomats at the US Embassy stopped eating local spinach, mushrooms and venison for a while during this period.

From 1986 to 1989, one third of the US House of Representative and 2/3 of the Senate came to Poland.  

In January 1987, Deputy Secretary of State John C. Whitehead came to Poland.  It was the first high level contact between the 2 governments since martial law.  Davis invited Walesa and Solidarity leaders Adam Michnik, Jacek Kuron and Janusz Onyszkiewicz for dinner with Whitehead.

After Whitehead’s visit, Davis started holding regular dinners for government officials, followed by separate dinners for Solidarity members, eventually mixing the two groups of people.

In February, 1987, the US government lifted sanctions it had imposed on the Polish government after it had crushed the Solidarity union.   In June 1987, Pope John Paul II came to Poland.  

Vice President Bush visited Poland on Sept 26, 1987, the day the official exchange of Ambassadors was agreed upon.  It was the first high level visit since President Carter had come to Poland in 1977.  During his stay, Vice President Bush had a 2 hour meeting with General Jaruzelski, who referred to Solidarity as “just a bunch of people that Davis is always inviting for dinner!”.   The Bush visit did not prompt the Polish government to lift the ban on Solidarity, but they did agree to Davis as the US Ambassador. 

As chargé, Davis shepherded the movement toward democracy along: hosting leaders of Solidarity in his residence, dealing with matters regarding economic sanctions relief, meeting with Lech Wałęsa after the latter won the Nobel Peace Prize that year, and fostering bilateral cooperation in exchange for amnesty of dissidents.

Ambassador
In October 1987, President Reagan nominated Davis to permanently hold the position of United States Ambassador to Poland. The 100th United States Congress accepted his nomination in February of the next year, and, on March 18, Davis presented his diplomatic credentials, thus becoming the first permanent ambassador in five years. As ambassador, Davis continued his work with the democracy movement, cultivating a deeper relationship with Wałęsa, helping bring Polish Round Table Agreement participants together, and increasing economic ties to the United States.   

The Roundtable talks began on February 6, 1989.  The talks led to a landmark power-sharing agreement negotiated by representative of the communist Polish government, leaders of the long-outlawed union Solidarity, and leaders of the Catholic Church that allowed for the first free elections in Eastern Europe in nearly 50 years.   Recently declassified State Department documents detail Ambassador Davis’ correct analysis and participation in the historic events during Poland’s revolution. 

During the lead up to the Roundtable talks and afterwards, Davis and his embassy staff kept the President extremely well informed, having nurtured ties both with their communist government counterparts and Solidarity leadership.  The depth of this understanding is evidence from the cables sent in 1989 and Davis’ analysis following the signing of the Round Table agreements.  The embassy understood what the Round Table agreements and impending free elections meant:  an overwhelming victory for Solidarity.  As Davis wrote on April 19, 1989, “(The communist authorities) are more likely to meet total defeat and great embarrassment”.   Davis sent back word to Washington that Solidarity would win, and win big.  While few others were openly predicting a “Solidarity sweep in the Senate”, Davis clearly saw that June 4 (election day) would be nothing but an outright victory for Solidarity.  In retrospect, the US embassy’ analysis of events in this instance was dead on.

Following Solidarity’s overwhelming victory in the elections, Davis quickly became concerned that utter catastrophe loomed on the horizon and that a crisis might ensue over the election of a new Polish president.  Because the election of Jaruzelski as president was an unwritten assumption of the Round Table agreements, the embassy, Washington, and many Solidarity activists correctly felt that if Solidarity reneged on this part of the deal, the whole framework of the agreement might fall apart.  It now became imperative to insure that General Jaruzelski be elected president.  In a stunning shift of policy, the Americans were now campaigning for the communist incumbent.

In this increasingly tense situation, Ambassador Davis met over dinner on June 22, 1989, with “some leading Solidarity legislators, who had better remain nameless”.  According to a secret cable sent the following day most Solidarity leaders felt that “If Jaruzelski is not elected president, there is a genuine danger of civil war ending …with a reluctant but brutal Soviet intervention”.  However, most Solidarity leaders had also pledged publicly not to vote for Jaruzelski, so they found themselves in a jam and came to Ambassador Davis looking for advice.  Davis jotted down a few numbers on the back of an embassy matchbook to explain the “arcane western political practice known as head-counting” whereby a large number of Solidarity delegate might not attend the election session.  The Solidarity delegates in attendance could then abstain from voting because the Party delegates would have such an overwhelming victory.  Davis was now actively advising Solidarity on how to elect General Jaruzelski.

By the end of June 1989, with President Bush’s visit rapidly approaching, the newly elected government had not yet settled the presidential crisis.  In fact, General Jaruzelski began to show signs that he was not willing to run for election, further endangering the precarious balance. 

On the evening of July 9, 1989, President Bush landed in Warsaw for a 2 day visit which included private meetings with General Jaruzelski and Lech Walesa, a reception at Ambassador Davis’ residence, and the historic opportunity to speak before the Polish parliament.  During the meetings with Jaruzelski, Bush pushed him to run for President. 40 Communist, Solidarity and Catholic leaders and 26 Americans were invited to a luncheon at the US Ambassador’s residence “the house of Helen and John Davis, who have done so much for the Polish cause”, as one Solidarity guest put it.  Deputy Bronislaw Geremek, who headed the Solidarity caucus, recalled it was only 2 years ago that the Bush’s had talked with members of Solidarity “right in this house, and even though at that time we heard words of hope, I believe that none of us at that time expected that we would meet in 2 years in a situation like the present”   It was a historic occasion, where “jailers and jailed” ate at the same table. A week after President Bush departed for Hungary, General Jaruzelski became President Jaruzelski, narrowly winning victory in the National Assembly by one vote. 
 

Secretary of State James Baker cabled Davis on July 2, 1989 “The sensible advice, analysis and recommendations in Warsaw were timely, informative and right on target to the Washington audience concerned about developments in Poland.  Your conversations with Walesa, in particular, helped calm a lot of nerves.  We know and appreciate that you are helping make history”.

On August 24, Tadeusz Mazowiecki, a long time Solidarity leader, was confirmed by the Sejm (the lower house of the Polish parliament) as prime minister and charged to create a government.  With that, Poland peacefully ended nearly a half-century of communist rule and Solidarity became the first freely elected party in a communist country.

In October 1989, there was a mass arrival of East Germans in Poland, wanting to emigrate to West Germany via Poland.  Polish-German Solidarity demonstrations broke out throughout the country with chants of “Pull down the Berlin wall”.   Five months later the Berlin Wall fell. By the end of 1989, all of Eastern Europe was free, after the fall of the Ceausescu regime in Romania, in December 1989.  The Soviet Union collapsed in 1991 and Soviet republics were given the right to leave. 

Davis contended that Solidarity leaders should be given credit for collapsing the whole of the communist system.  “We spent $4 trillion fighting the Cold War and we looked up one day and the war was won by a small group of people in Poland without firing a shot” he said.  

Davis had successfully fulfilled his mission, and he requested new orders from the State Department.  Deputy Secretary of State Lawrence Eagleburger responded by cable:  “Your next task is to promote and ensure the realization of economic prosperity in Poland, to include stable growth, full employment, low inflation, high productivity, and a Mercedes (or equivalent) in every garage”.

In Nov 1989, Lech Walesa was invited to address a joint session of Congress, and Davis accompanied him on the visit.  It was the first time a foreign citizen not holding a government position addressed Congress since Winston Churchill in 1945.  Following the speech, there was a senate luncheon honoring the electrician from Gdansk.  Walesa said his “legs were still a little rubbery” from nervousness after what the called “the most difficult speech of my life”.  And in thanking the assembled senators, he said he was particularly grateful to one man in the room “our Ambassador – well, perhaps I should say YOUR ambassador, because I speak of John Davis, but we think of him as ours”.

Davis ended his service in Poland in July 1990, at the impending appointment of his successor, Thomas W. Simons Jr. Davis received the Distinguished Honor Award;the highest award the State Department confers, whose previous recipients include Philip Habib, Rozanne Ridgway and Lawrence Eagleburger.  In presenting the award, Secretary of State James Baker referred to the historic times through which Davis had represented his country in Poland.  In his remarks, Davis said that it is not often that one is paid for doing something one would happily do for nothing.  Baker also said had their existed a parallel distinction destined for Ambassador’s wives, Helen Davis would be the one to receive it, and it was a great pity no such distinction had been established.

In Nov 2019, former Director of National Intelligence Dan Coats said that “after Walesa, Gorbachev and John Paul II, the fourth person with the most critical role in bringing about the collapse of communism in Eastern Europe” is John Roger Davis Jr.  Coats says “Ambassador Davis was a key participant in all of the events and much of the decision-making in Poland that led to the communist party retiring its flags and turning the central committee building into Poland’s first stock exchange.  With his critical help, an entrenched power elite – with all the means of coercion at its disposal and the Red Army at its back – voluntarily and without violence relinquished power to democratic forces through peaceful negotiation.  It was the first time such a thing had occurred in all of human history. 

Upon his return to the United States, Davis took a year off to be a diplomat in residence at Yale University.

Romania
In May 1990, George H. W. Bush appointed Davis as the United States Ambassador to Romania. Davis presented his credentials on March 11, 1992, where he again nurtured democracy, before leaving in August 1994.

During his time as ambassador, he had security concerns regarding Harold James Nicholson. His fears were well-founded. Later, it was discovered that Nicholson was spying for Russia. The New York Times reported that Nicholson was "the highest-ranking C.I.A. official ever convicted of espionage."

Personal life
Davis married Helen Marie Carey in 1956. They have three children.  Thorp J. Davis, Katherine Davis,  Anne Davis as well as 9 grandchildren.  Davis speaks Polish and Italian.

References

External links
 John Roger Davis Jr. at the Office of the Historian
 Interview with Davis for the Association for Diplomatic Studies and Training
 Davis included among previous ambassadors at the Embassy of the United States, Warsaw
 Ambassador John Davis: The 1989 Roundtable Talks and Solidarność 25 Years Later April 3, 2014 The Miller Center, University of Virginia

1927 births
Living people
People from Eau Claire, Wisconsin
Military personnel from Wisconsin
United States Foreign Service personnel
Ambassadors of the United States to Poland
Ambassadors of the United States to Romania
University of Southern California alumni
Harvard Kennedy School alumni
American expatriates in Indonesia
American expatriates in Italy
American expatriates in Australia